Andrew O'Connor may refer to:

Andrew O'Connor (actor) (born 1963), British actor
Andrew O'Connor (sculptor) (1874–1941), American sculptor
Andrew O'Connor (writer) (born 1978), Australian novelist
Andy O'Connor (1884–1980), baseball player